Stewart Brand (born December 14, 1938) is an American writer, best known as editor of the Whole Earth Catalog. He founded a number of organizations, including The WELL, the Global Business Network, and the Long Now Foundation. He is the author of several books, most recently Whole Earth Discipline: An Ecopragmatist Manifesto.

Life 

Brand was born in Rockford, Illinois, and attended Phillips Exeter Academy in New Hampshire. He studied biology at Stanford University, graduating in 1960. As a soldier in the U.S. Army, he was a parachutist and taught infantry skills; he later expressed the view that his experience in the military had fostered his competence in organizing. A civilian again in 1962, he studied design at San Francisco Art Institute, photography at San Francisco State College, and participated in a legitimate scientific study of then-legal LSD, in Menlo Park, California. In 1966, he married mathematician Lois Jennings, an Ottawa Native American.

Brand has lived in California since the 1960s. He and his second wife live on Mirene, a -long working tugboat. Built in 1912, the boat is moored in a former shipyard in Sausalito, California. He works in Mary Heartline, a grounded fishing boat about 100 yards (90 metres) away. One of his favorite items is a table on which Otis Redding is said to have written "(Sittin' On) The Dock of the Bay". (Brand acquired it from an antiques dealer in Sausalito.)

USCO and Merry Pranksters
By the mid-1960s, Brand became associated with New York multimedia group USCO and Bay Area author Ken Kesey and his "Merry Pranksters". Brand co-produced the Trips Festival, an early effort involving rock music and light shows, in San Francisco with Kesey and Ramón Sender Barayón. This was one of the first venues at which the Grateful Dead performed in San Francisco. About 10,000 hippies attended, and Haight-Ashbury soon emerged as a community. Tom Wolfe describes Brand in his 1968 book, The Electric Kool-Aid Acid Test.

NASA images of Earth

In 1966, while on an LSD trip on the roof of his house in North Beach, San Francisco, Brand became convinced that seeing an image of the whole Earth would change how we think about the planet and ourselves.  He then campaigned to have NASA release the then-rumored satellite image of the entire Earth as seen from space. He sold and distributed buttons for 25 cents each asking, "Why haven't we seen a photograph of the whole Earth yet?". During this campaign, Brand met Richard Buckminster Fuller, who offered to help Brand with his projects. In 1967, a satellite, ATS-3, took the photo. Brand thought the image of our planet would be a powerful symbol. It adorned the first (Fall 1968) edition of the Whole Earth Catalog. Later in 1968, NASA astronaut Bill Anders took an Earth photo, Earthrise, from Moon orbit, which became the front image of the spring 1969 edition of the Catalog. 1970 saw the first celebration of Earth Day. During a 2003 interview, Brand explained that the image "gave the sense that Earth's an island, surrounded by a lot of inhospitable space. And it's so graphic, this little blue, white, green and brown jewel-like icon amongst a quite featureless black vacuum."

Douglas Engelbart
In late 1968, Brand assisted electrical engineer Douglas Engelbart with The Mother of All Demos, a famous presentation of many revolutionary computer technologies (including hypertext, email, and the mouse) to the Fall Joint Computer Conference in San Francisco.

Brand surmised that given the necessary consciousness, information, and tools, human beings could reshape the world they had made (and were making) for themselves into something environmentally and socially sustainable.

Whole Earth Catalog 

During the late 1960s and early 1970s about 10 million Americans were involved in living communally. In 1968, using the most basic approaches to typesetting and page-layout, Brand and his colleagues created issue number one of The Whole Earth Catalog, employing the significant subtitle, "access to tools". Brand and his wife Lois travelled to communes in a 1963 Dodge truck known as the Whole Earth Truck Store, which moved to a storefront in Menlo Park, California.  That first oversize Catalog, and its successors in the 1970s and later, reckoned a wide assortment of things could serve as useful "tools": books, maps, garden implements, specialized clothing, carpenters' and masons' tools, forestry gear, tents, welding equipment, professional journals, early synthesizers, and personal computers. Brand invited "reviews" (written in the form of a letter to a friend) of the best of these items from experts in specific fields. The information also described where these things could be located or purchased. The Catalogs publication coincided with the great wave of social and cultural experimentation, convention-breaking, and "do it yourself" attitude associated with the "counterculture".

The influence of these Whole Earth Catalogs on the rural back-to-the-land movement of the 1970s, and the communities movement within many cities, was widespread throughout the United States, Canada, and Australia. A 1972 edition sold 1.5 million copies, winning the first U.S. National Book Award in category Contemporary Affairs.

Steve Jobs ended his 2005 Stanford University commencement address by acknowledging both Stewart Brand and the Whole Earth Catalog, quoting from the latter's final issue, "Stay Hungry, Stay Foolish."

CoEvolution Quarterly
To continue this work and also to publish full-length articles on specific topics in the natural sciences and invention, in numerous areas of the arts and the social sciences, and on the contemporary scene in general, Brand founded the CoEvolution Quarterly (CQ) during 1974, aimed primarily at educated laypersons.  Brand never better revealed his opinions and reason for hope than when he ran, in CoEvolution Quarterly #4, a transcription of technology historian Lewis Mumford's talk "The Next Transformation of Man", in which he stated that "man has still within him sufficient resources to alter the direction of modern civilization, for we then need no longer regard man as the passive victim of his own irreversible technological development."

The content of CoEvolution Quarterly often included futurism or risqué topics. Besides giving space to unknown writers with something valuable to say, Brand presented articles by many respected authors and thinkers, including Lewis Mumford, Howard T. Odum, Witold Rybczynski, Karl Hess, Orville Schell, Ivan Illich, Wendell Berry, Ursula K. Le Guin, Gregory Bateson, Amory Lovins, Hazel Henderson, Gary Snyder, Lynn Margulis, Eric Drexler, Gerard K. O'Neill, Peter Calthorpe, Sim Van der Ryn, Paul Hawken, John Todd, Kevin Kelly, and Donella Meadows.  During ensuing years, Brand authored and edited a number of books on topics as diverse as computer-based media, the life history of buildings, and ideas about space colonies.

He founded the Whole Earth Software Review, a supplement to the Whole Earth Software Catalog, in 1984. It merged with CoEvolution Quarterly to form the Whole Earth Review in 1985.

California government
From 1977 to 1979, Brand served as "special advisor" to the administration of California Governor Jerry Brown.

The WELL
In 1985, Brand and Larry Brilliant founded The WELL ("Whole Earth 'Lectronic Link"), a prototypical, wide-ranging online community for intelligent, informed participants the world over. The WELL won the 1990 Best Online Publication Award from the Computer Press Association. Almost certainly the ideas behind the WELL were greatly inspired by Douglas Engelbart's work at SRI International; Brand was acknowledged by Engelbart in "The Mother of All Demos" in 1968 when the computer mouse and video conferencing were introduced.

All Species Foundation
In 2000, Brand helped to launch the All Species Foundation, which aimed to catalog all species of life on Earth until its closure in 2007.

Global Business Network

During 1986, Brand was a visiting scientist at the MIT Media Lab. Soon after, he became a private-conference organizer for such corporations as Royal Dutch/Shell, Volvo, and AT&T Corporation. In 1988, he became a co‑founder of the Global Business Network, which explores global futures and business strategies informed by the sorts of values and information which Brand has always found vital. The GBN has become involved with the evolution and application of scenario thinking, planning, and complementary strategic tools. For fourteen years, Brand was on the board of the Santa Fe Institute (founded in 1984), an organization devoted to "fostering a multidisciplinary scientific research community pursuing frontier science." He has also continued to promote the preservation of tracts of wilderness.

Whole Earth Discipline
The Whole Earth Catalog implied an ideal of human progress that depended on decentralized, personal, and liberating technological development—so‑called "soft technology". However, during 2005 he criticized aspects of the international environmental ideology he had helped to develop. He wrote an article called "Environmental Heresies" in the May 2005 issue of the MIT Technology Review, in which he describes what he considers necessary changes to environmentalism. He suggested among other things that environmentalists embrace nuclear power and genetically modified organisms as technologies with more promise than risk.

Brand later developed these ideas into a book and published the Whole Earth Discipline: An Ecopragmatist Manifesto in 2009. The book examines how urbanization, nuclear power, genetic engineering, geoengineering, and wildlife restoration can be used as powerful tools in humanity's ongoing fight against global warming.

In a 2019 interview, Brand described his perspective as "post-libertarian", indicating that at the time when the Whole Earth Catalog was being written, he did not fully understand the significance of the role of government in the development of technology and engineering. In his environmental position he self-describes as an "Eco-pragmatist".

Long Now Foundation
Brand is co‑chair and president of the board of directors of the Long Now Foundation.  Brand chairs the foundation's Seminars About Long-term Thinking (SALT).  This series on long-term thinking has presented a large range of different speakers including: Brian Eno, Neal Stephenson, Vernor Vinge, Philip Rosedale, Jimmy Wales, Kevin Kelly, Clay Shirky, Ray Kurzweil, Bruce Sterling, Cory Doctorow, and many others.

Works
Stewart Brand is the initiator or was involved with the development of the following:
The Whole Earth Catalog in 1968
CoEvolution Quarterly in 1974
The Whole Earth Software Catalog and Review in 1984
Whole Earth Review in 1985
Point Foundation
Global Business Network (co-founder)
The WELL in 1985, with Larry Brilliant
The Hackers Conference in 1984
Long Now Foundation in 1996, with computer scientist Danny Hillis—one of the Foundation's projects is to build a 10,000 year clock, the Clock of the Long Now
New Games Tournament (was involved initially, but left the project)
In April 2015, Brand joined with a group of scholars in issuing An Ecomodernist Manifesto. The other authors were: John Asafu-Adjaye, Linus Blomqvist, Barry Brook. Ruth DeFries, Erle Ellis, Christopher Foreman, David Keith, Martin Lewis, Mark Lynas, Ted Nordhaus, Roger A. Pielke Jr., Rachel Pritzker, Joyashree Roy, Mark Sagoff, Michael Shellenberger, Robert Stone, and Peter Teague

Publications

Books
II Cybernetic Frontiers, 1974,  (hardcover),  (paperback)
 The Media Lab: Inventing the Future at MIT, 1987,  (hardcover); 1988,  (paperback)
 How Buildings Learn: What Happens After They're Built, 1994. 
 The Clock of the Long Now: Time and Responsibility, 1999. 
 Whole Earth Discipline: An Ecopragmatist Manifesto, Viking Adult, 2009. 
 The Salt Summaries:  Seminars About Long-term Thinking, Long Now Press, 2011.  (paperback)

As editor or as co-editor 
The Whole Earth Catalog, 1968–72 (original editor, winner of the National Book Award, 1972)
 Last Whole Earth Catalog: Access to Tools, 1971
 Whole Earth Epilog: Access to Tools, 1974, 
 The (Updated) Last Whole Earth Catalog: Access to Tools, 16th edition, 1975, 
 Space Colonies, Whole Earth Catalog, 1977, 
 As co-editor with J. Baldwin: Soft-Tech, 1978, 
 The Next Whole Earth Catalog: Access to Tools, 1980, ;
 The Next Whole Earth Catalog: Access to Tools, revised 2nd edition, 1981, 
 As editor-in-chief: Whole Earth Software Catalog, 1984, 
 As editor-in-chief: Whole Earth Software Catalog for 1986, "2.0 edition" of above title, 1985, 
 As co-editor with Art Kleiner: News That Stayed News, 1974–1984: Ten Years of CoEvolution Quarterly, 1986,  (hardcover),  (paperback)
 Introduction by Brand: The Essential Whole Earth Catalog: Access to Tools and Ideas (Introduction by Brand), 1986, 
 Foreword by Brand: Signal: Communication Tools for the Information Age, editor: Kevin Kelly, 1988, 
 Foreword by Brand: The Fringes of Reason: A Whole Earth Catalog, editor: Ted Schultz, 1989, 
 Foreword by Brand: Whole Earth Ecolog: The Best of Environmental Tools & Ideas, editor: J. Baldwin, 1990,

See also 

 Bright green environmentalism

References 

 Phil Garlington, "Stewart Brand," Outside magazine, December 1977.
 Sam Martin and Matt Scanlon, "The Long Now: An Interview with Stewart Brand," Mother Earth News magazine, January 2001
 "Stewart Brand" (c.v., last updated September 2006)
 Massive Change Radio interview with Stewart Brand, November 2003
 Whole Earth Catalog, various issues, 1968–1998.
 CoEvolution Quarterly (in the 1980s, renamed Whole Earth Review, later just Whole Earth), various issues, 1974–2002.

Further reading 
Markoff, John. Whole Earth: The Many Lives of Stewart Brand. New York: Penguin, 2022.
Binkley, Sam. Getting Loose: Lifestyle Consumption in the 1970s. Durham: Duke University Press, 2007.
Brokaw, Tom. "Stewart Brand." BOOM! Voices of the Sixties. New York: Random House, 2007.
Kirk, Andrew G.  Counterculture Green: The Whole Earth Catalog and American Environmentalism. Lawrence: Univ. of Kansas Press, 2007.
Markoff, John. What the Dormouse Said: How the Sixties Counterculture Shaped the Personal Computer Industry. New York: Penguin, 2005.
 Turner, Fred

External links 

 
 
 
 
  Stewart Brand Papers housed at Stanford University Libraries
 

American book editors
American information and reference writers
American magazine editors
American non-fiction environmental writers
American social sciences writers
American technology writers
American environmentalists
American futurologists
History of San Francisco
National Book Award winners
Writers from Rockford, Illinois
Phillips Exeter Academy alumni
Stanford University alumni
Sustainability advocates
Wired (magazine) people
Whole Earth Catalog
1938 births
Living people
People from Sausalito, California
United States Army soldiers
Journalists from Illinois
20th-century American writers
20th-century American journalists
American male journalists